Gastin Simukonda (born 26 February 1993) is a Malawian football striker who currently plays for Moyale Barracks.

References

1993 births
Living people
Malawian footballers
Malawi international footballers
Moyale Barracks FC players
CD Costa do Sol players
Association football forwards
Malawian expatriate footballers
Expatriate footballers in Mozambique
Malawian expatriate sportspeople in Mozambique
People from Mzimba District